The 48 Class is a class of diesel locomotives built by AE Goodwin, Auburn for the New South Wales Department of Railways between 1959 and 1970. Once the most ubiquitous locomotive in New South Wales, Australia, It is based on Alco frames and prime movers, using General Electric (later Associated Electrical Industries) electrical equipment. The South Australian Railways 830 and Silverton Rail 48s classes are of a very similar design.

History
The 48 Class were ordered to commence the conversion of branch lines to diesel traction with the first entering service in September 1959. Further orders saw 165 in service by October 1970. There were four versions:
Mark 1: 4801 – 4845
Mark 2: 4846 – 4885
Mark 3: 4886 – 48125
Mark 4: 48126 – 48165

The Mark 1s and Mark 2s can be distinguished from the others by their fuel tank, which incorporates the brake reservoir tanks on either side.

As well as branch lines, they operated both main line and metropolitan services on every line in the state. Aside from a couple written off after accidents in the mid-1980s, withdrawals didn't commence in earnest until August 1994. In December 1994, the first Mark 1s were sold. By June 1997, FreightCorp's fleet was down to 120 units.

Others have been withdrawn since and as at January 2014, 66 remained in service primarily with Pacific National. GrainCorp, Greentrains, Junee Railway Workshop and Sydney Trains also operate some.

By operator

Railway Services Authority/RailCorp
Two (4819 & 4827) were transferred by the State Rail Authority to the Railway Service Authority, these have since passed to RailCorp.

Silverton Rail/Greentrains
In December 1994, Silverton Rail purchased six from FreightCorp. All were placed in service as their Silverton Rail 48s class. Some of these remain in service in January 2014 in the ownership of Greentrains.

Australian National/One Australia
In December 1994, Australian National purchased two from FreightCorp with 4813 rebuilt as DA7 for the narrow gauge Eyre Peninsula Railway and 4826 scrapped some years later at Port Augusta. As at August 2019, the locomotive remains in service on the far western portion of the Eyre Peninsula Railway narrow gauge network with One Rail Australia working the Thevenard gypsum traffic, renumbered 906.

Austrac Ready Power/Junee Railway Workshop
Austrac Ready Power purchased four (4814, 4816, 4820 & 4836) from a scrap dealer and placed three in service on their various services. Following Austrac ceasing all passed to Junee Railway Workshop.

Cargill Australia
In February 1997, 4812 was rebuilt and repainted by FreightCorp at Delec Locomotive Depot for Cargill Australia for use as a shunter at their Kooragang Island plant numbered CAR1. It was sold to Junee Railway Workshop. It was scrapped in 2016.

GrainCorp
GrainCorp have purchased 18 Mark 3s and are having them overhauled by Junee Railway Workshop at which point they are renumbered into the 482xx series.

PL class
Seven Mark 2 locomotives were rebuilt by FreightCorp between 1999 and 2001 as the PL (for PortLink) class. Changes included the short end cab nose being lowered, the cab altered, and the installation of air-conditioning. They were designed to operate in push-pull formation on intermodal container trains between Port Botany and Clyde/Yennora.

PL1 and PL2 were transferred to South Australia after the sale of FreightCorp to Pacific National for use at Keswick Terminal shunting for Great Southern Rail which was prior a National Rail contract. PL2 was transferred back to NSW with PL1 remaining in South Australia. In NSW the class saw use on the former South Maitland Railway hauling coal along with 48 class locos. After a long period of storage at Kooragang Island, PL2, PL3, PL5, PL6 and PL7 were scrapped in 2013. PL4 was finally scrapped at Narrabri in late 2016 after being stored there for years. PL1 remains in service as a shunter at the Progress Rail workshops in Port Augusta.

Preserved
As of January 2021, there are eight preserved locomotives, four of them operational:
4801: Transport Heritage NSW, stored at Broadmeadow Locomotive Depot
4803: Transport Heritage NSW, in the custody of NSW Rail Museum, Thirlmere, operational
4805: Transport Heritage NSW, stored at Broadmeadow Locomotive Depot
4807: Transport Heritage NSW, in the custody of NSW Rail Museum, Thirlmere, operational
4821: Goulburn Rail Heritage Centre, operational
4822: Dorrigo Steam Railway & Museum, stored
4833: Transport Heritage NSW, in the custody of NSW Rail Museum, Thirlmere, operational
4872: Junee Roundhouse Railway Museum, stored

References

Further reading

External links

A. E. Goodwin locomotives
Co-Co locomotives
Diesel locomotives of New South Wales
Pacific National diesel locomotives
Railway locomotives introduced in 1959
Standard gauge locomotives of Australia
Diesel-electric locomotives of Australia